Lake James State Park is a North Carolina state park in Burke and McDowell Counties, North Carolina in the United States.

History
Started in 1987, Lake James State Park had 471,566 visitors in 2014. The park added 2,915 acres purchased from Crescent Resources, which once managed Duke Energy real estate, in the Long Arm Peninsula and Paddy's Creek areas in 2005. On January 11, 2016, Governor Pat McCrory announced the addition of 129 acres with 8900 feet of shoreline. The land was purchased for $1.74 million through the  N.C. Parks and Recreation Trust Fund and the federal Land and Water Conservation Fund. Crescent Communities (formerly Crescent Resources) had kept the land in 2005 but sold it after The Foothills Conservancy of North Carolina arranged the deal.

Nearby state parks
The following state parks and state forests are within  of Lake James State Park:
Chimney Rock State Park
Grandfather Mountain State Park
Mount Mitchell State Park
Roan Mountain State Park, Tennessee
South Mountains State Park
Tuttle Educational State Forest

See also
 Fonta Flora State Trail
 Overmountain Victory National Historic Trail

References

External links
 

Protected areas established in 1987
State parks of North Carolina
State parks of the Appalachians
Protected areas of Burke County, North Carolina
Protected areas of McDowell County, North Carolina
Open-air museums in North Carolina